Elizabeth Eslami is an Iranian American writer of novels, essays, and short stories.

Life 

Elizabeth Eslami was born in Gaffney, South Carolina. She received her B.A. from Sarah Lawrence College and her MFA from the Warren Wilson College MFA Program for Writers. Her debut novel, Bone Worship, appeared in 2010. Her essays, short stories, and travel writing have appeared or are forthcoming in The Sun, The Literary Review, Michigan Quarterly Review, Crab Orchard Review, The Millions, Matador Network  and others. She is a frequent contributor to The Nervous Breakdown. Her work is also featured in the anthologies Tremors: New Fiction By Iranian American Writers (2013) and Writing Off Script: Writers on the Influence of Cinema (2011).
Eslami was awarded the 2013 Ohio State University Short Fiction Prize for her collection of short stories, Hibernate, which was also a finalist for the 2011 Flannery O'Connor Award for Short Fiction.

Eslami taught Creative Writing at Indiana University from 2014-2016. She is now the Hampton and Esther Boswell Distinguished Professor of Creative Writing at DePauw University.

Awards 

 2013 Ohio State University Short Fiction Prize for Hibernate

Works

References

External links 
 Eslami's website
 Book review and interview, Bend Bulletin (OR)
 Review of Bone Worship in Boston Globe
 Review of Bone Worship in NW Asian Weekly
 Review of Bone Worship in Eugene Weekly
 Appearance at Nye Beach Writers' Series, 2012
 Interview with Eslami

Year of birth missing (living people)
Living people